Dollard is an unincorporated community, within the Rural Municipality of Arlington No. 79, Saskatchewan, Canada. The community is situated on the historic Red Coat Trail in the southwest corner of the province, 13 km west of the town of Shaunavon and 21 km east of the town of Eastend. It is approximately 100 km from the Montana USA border and 130 km to the Alberta border.

History

By 1908 enough French speaking settlers had arrived in the region to establish a community which they named Valroy (Val Roy). The name was later changed to Dollard. The name Dollard was chosen by Father Louis-Pierre Gravel (the founder of Gravelbourg) to honour the memory of a hero of New France, Adam Dollard, Sieur des Ormeaux.

A post office was established in 1909 and in 1911 the church of Sainte-Jeanne d'Arc (Joan of Arc) was built. A store soon followed and then a school in 1912.

The post office closed in 1988.

Demographics 

Dollard in popular culture 

The character Wanda Dollard from the Canadian comedy television series Corner Gas is named for this town.

See also 

 List of communities in Saskatchewan

References

Arlington No. 79, Saskatchewan
Designated places in Saskatchewan
Former villages in Saskatchewan
Unincorporated communities in Saskatchewan
French communities
Division No. 4, Saskatchewan